Pouso Alegre is a municipality in southern region of Minas Gerais state, Brazil, with a population of 152,549 in 2020.  The area of the municipality is 543 km². It lies in the valley of the Sapucaí River.

Cities that form boundaries with Pouso Alegre are: Cachoeira de Minas, Santa Rita do Sapucaí, Careaçu, São Sebastião da Bela Vista, Estiva, Congonhal,
São João da Mata and Silvianópolis.

The distance to the state capital, Belo Horizonte, is 385 km, to São Paulo 202 km, and to Rio de Janeiro 390 km. The city is 8 km. from the main interstate highway BR-381 (Rodovia Fernão Dias), which connects São Paulo to Belo Horizonte.

Pouso Alegre is an industrial center with industries in the food sector, textiles, and metallurgy.  Many national and multinational enterprises have their plants here. Their activities include food (Unilever), clothing (Searchco), cars (Usiparts - Johnson Control's - Sumidenso), pharmaceuticals (ACG Capsules, Uniao Quimica, Sanobiol), 
glass (Sobral Invicta), and many other small and medium enterprises.

Geography 
According to the modern (2017) geographic classification by Brazil's National Institute of Geography and Statistics (IBGE), the city is the main municipality in the Intermediate Geographic Region of Pouso Alegre.

History 

The "Bandeirantes" explored all the Brazilian country looking for gold and other mineral resources. They were the first European explorers to arrive in the ancient Pouso Alegre region, in 1596.

After discovering gold in the Santana's mines, they founded the new village called "Matosinho do Mandu", Pouso Alegre's first name. New paths were built to connect Pouso Alegre to other cities. These paths connected it to São Paulo and to Vila Rica.

In 1797 the Governor Dom Bernardo José de Lorena, Sarzedas Baron, passing by the small village became so enchanted by its nature, by "the vast and clean horizons", said "This village should not be called Mandu, but Pouso Alegre". In Portuguese, Pouso Alegre means "a joyful stay".

The 2009 census of the city population was 131,462 inhabitants. The city is the nineteenth largest city in Minas Gerais and the second largest in southern Minas Gerais.

Population growth

1996 - 94,354 inhabitants
2000 - 106,457 inhabitants
2010 - 140,658 inhabitants

The city of Pouso Alegre stands out in the region by high buildings found in its central region. The highest building in the city is building Octávio Meyer, with 70m and 20 floors. It has been the highest building since 2004, the year of its completion.

Economy

Commercial specifications 

Pouso Alegre has more than 4,500 stores in its commercial area. The statistic is made by ACIPA in 2010. Some of the stores in the city are: Bob's, Chilli Beans, Colcci, Cia. Hering, Kaza Houseware, M.Officer, N-Store, OAK Shop.

Business and industry
The city is an important industrial center in the region. Several different kinds of industries are present in the city. In 2012 the city will receive the largest Chinese investment in Latin America, with the installation of heavy machinery industry, XCMG and 18 other industries have settled in the city between 2008 and 2012. Some of the industries in the city are: Unilever, Ball Corporation, Alpargatas, and Yoki.

Sports 
Estádio Municipal Irmão Gino Maria Rossi, which is nicknamed Manduzão, is the home of Pouso Alegre Futebol Clube. The stadium has a capacity of 17,000.

Distances 

Itajubá 65 km
Santa Rita do Sapucaí (“Valley Electronics”) 25 km
Poços de Caldas 100 km
Varginha (dry port / customs) 123 km
São Paulo 200 km
Santos (harbor) 260 km
São José dos Campos 150 km
Campinas (international airport) 200 km
Guarulhos (international airport) 180 km
Senador José Bento 32 km
Belo Horizonte 384 km
Rio de Janeiro 360 km
Porto Alegre 1,300 km
Salvador 1,790 km
Recife 2,400 km
Brasília 1,084 km

References

External links 
 Pouso Alegre government website

Municipalities in Minas Gerais